The Geely Yuanjing sedan is a four-door compact sedan produced by the Chinese automaker Geely under the Yuanjing or Vision product series. It is the first commercial car produced by Geely Automobiles. The car was first introduced in 2006. It carries the first CVVT engine designed and made in China. The car was named Geely Tiger, Biaowang and Luhu, but it later renamed "Vision" (远景, Yuǎn jǐng). 

Geely Yuanjing went on sale on May 18, 2007 after being adjusted by Magna Steyr.
Geely Haijing (Englon Haijing) was based on SMA Haijing, which designed similar to first generation Geely Yuanjing. It carries 6-speed tiptronic transmission or 5-speed automatic transmission which is the same as Geely Yuanjing.

First generation (FC1; 2007)
The first generation of Geely Yuanjing went on sale on May 18, 2007 after being adjusted by Magna Steyr. Originally named the Geely FC, the compact sedan was later renamed to Geely Yuanjing (Vision) sedan under the Yuanjing (Vision) product series as opposed to the Geely Emgrand (EC7) sedan of the Geely Emgrand product series (Previously a separate sub-brand of Geely). It set its opposite as Hyundai Elantra, which was being sold better than most models in China.

Styling
Styling of the Geely Yuanjing throughout the generations remains similar as the second and third generation cars were extensive facelifts of the first. The original Geely Yuanjing was criticized for resembling the Toyota Corolla (E120), as the Yuanjing was developed benchmarking the compact sedan from Toyota. Most of the early Geely products have the tendency of resembling Toyota products as reverse engineering took a huge part in Geely's past.

Technology
Geely Yuanjing carries the most advanced engine produced by Chinese manufacturers at the time, providing ABS and EBD systems for all models.

Geely Haijing

Geely Haijing, which was developed from SMA Haijing, is one of the flagship commercial automobile produced by Chinese car manufacturer Geely. It was introduced in 2009 by Shanghai Maple Motors, later renamed Englon SC7 or Englon Haijing. The Haijing equipped 2 front parking sensors and 4 rear parking sensors. The high match models are powered with 1.8T engine with 6-speed automatic transmission produced by Australian gearbox manufacturer Drivetrain Systems International.

Second generation (FC2; 2013)

The Geely Yuanjing sedan went through a few facelifts with code names FC, FC2, and the FC3 launched in late 2017. The side profile closely resembles the Toyota Corolla from the 2000s throughout the FC, FC2, and FC3 facelifts. The FC2 has completely redesigned front and rear DRGs which requires new front and rear fenders. However, the rest of the vehicle especially the side profile remains unchanged due to the base being the old FC platform. The FC2 is sometimes referred as the second generation Geely Yuanjing or Geely Yuanjing II.

Third generation (FC3; 2018)

The second facelift was done in late 2017, code-named the FC3. Just like the previous facelift, the platform remains unchanged, and this time the old front and rear fenders of the FC2 were also preserved as the edge of the front and tail lamps remains unchanged. Changes on the front are subtile while the tail lamp was redesigned to be positioned horizontally and keeping the original boundaries of the FC2 generation, the rear license plate was also moved downwards onto the rear bumper. The FC3 is sometimes referred to as the third generation Geely Yuanjing or Geely Yuanjing III.

References

External links

Yuanjing
Compact cars
Front-wheel-drive vehicles
Sedans
Cars introduced in 2006
2010s cars
Cars of China